Pinocchio is a 90-minute musical adaptation of Carlo Collodi's classic 1883 book. It aired on NBC on December 8, 1968, as part of the Hallmark Hall of Fame series.

Peter Noone, lead singer of Herman's Hermits, played Pinocchio and Burl Ives was cast as Mister Geppetto. Walter Marks wrote the songs, and the script was adapted by Ernest Kinoy.

Cast
 Burl Ives — Geppetto
 Peter Noone — Pinocchio
 Anita Gillette — Blue Fairy
 Mort Marshall — Cat
 Jack Fletcher — Fox
 Ned Wertimer — Farmer Whale
 Charlotte Rae — Rosa Whale
 Pierre Epstein — Weasel

Production 
Pinocchio was recorded on videotape at NBC's Brooklyn Studio.

Noone was fitted with a fake nose that initially was problematic for the production staff. Richard Lewine, the show's producer, described the problem to TV Guide:

"Since we didn't want to cheat the audience out of seeing it grow, we hired Bil Baird to create one. Bil stood behind Pinocchio, out of camera range, holding the end of a rod that attached to the nose. When he pushed the rod, the nose, made from expandable material, lengthened. It worked beautifully," Lewine said.

"But when we went on camera, we discovered that you could see the separation between the fake nose and Peter's real one. Two hours of work with the make-up man solved the problem, but it was worrisome," he said.

Broadcast
NBC aired the special on Sunday, December 8, 1968, at 7 p.m. Eastern Standard Time. It pre-empted two regular shows on NBC's schedule, The New Adventures of Huckleberry Finn and Walt Disney's Wonderful World of Color.

Songs
 "Chip Off The Old Block"
 "Wonderful World, Hello"
 "Beautiful People"
 "Little Bad Habits"
 "Walk With Him"
 "You Could Get To Like It"
 "It's A Dog's Life"
 "Too Soon"

References

External links
 

1960s American television specials
Hallmark Hall of Fame episodes
Musical television films
Pinocchio films
1968 television films
1968 films
1968 television specials